The Santalaceae, sandalwoods, are a widely distributed family of flowering plants (including small trees, shrubs, perennial herbs, and epiphytic climbers) which, like other members of Santalales, are partially parasitic on other plants. Its flowers are bisexual or, by abortion ("flower drop"), unisexual. Modern treatments of the Santalaceae include the family Viscaceae (mistletoes), previously considered distinct.

The APG II system of 2003  recognises the family and assigns it to the order Santalales in the clade core eudicots. However, the circumscription by APG is much wider than accepted by previous classifications, including the plants earlier treated in families Eremolepidaceae and Viscaceae. It includes about 1,000 species in 43 genera. Many have reported traditional and cultural uses, including as medicine.

Genera 

Acanthosyris
Amphorogyne
Anthobolus
Antidaphne (previously Eremolepidaceae)
Arceuthobium (previously Viscaceae)
Buckleya
Cervantesia Ruiz & Pavón
Choretrum R.Br.
Cladomyza
Comandra Nutt. 
Daenikera
Dendromyza
Dendrophthora (previously Viscaceae)
Dendrotrophe
Dufrenoya
Elaphanthera
Eubrachion (previously Eremolepidaceae)
Exocarpos Pers.
Geocaulon
Ginalloa (previously Viscaceae)
Henslowia
Jodina
Korthalsella Tiegh.
Kunkeliella
Lepidoceras (previously Eremolepidaceae)
Leptomeria
Mida
Myoschilos
Nanodea
Nestronia
Notothixos (previously Viscaceae)
Okoubaka Pellegr. & Normand
Omphacomeria
Osyridicarpos
Osyris
Phacellaria
Phoradendron Nutt. (previously Viscaceae)
Pilgerina Z.S.Rogers, Nickrent & Malécot
Pyrularia 
Rhoiacarpos
Santalum L.
Scleropyrum
Spirogardnera
Staufferia
Thesidium
Thesium L.
Viscum L. (previously Viscaceae)

excluded genera:
Arjona - to Schoepfiaceae
Quinchamalium - to Schoepfiaceae

References

External links

 Parasitic Plant Connection web site: Amphorogynaceae
 Parasitic Plant Connection web site: Cervantesiaceae
 Parasitic Plant Connection web site: Comandraceae
 Parasitic Plant Connection web site: Nanodeaceae
 Parasitic Plant Connection web site: Santalaceae s. str.
 Parasitic Plant Connection web site: Thesiaceae
 Parasitic Plant Connection web site: Viscaceae

 
Eudicot families